The Tangail Airdrop was a successful battalion-size Para Commandos (India) operation mounted on 11 December 1971 by the 2nd Battalion (Special Operations) (2 PARA) of the Indian Army's Parachute Regiment and the 49 Squadron of the Indian Air Force during the Indo-Pakistani War of 1971  for the liberation of Bangladesh. The main objective of the operation was the capture of Poongli Bridge on the Jamuna River which would cut off the Pakistani 93rd Brigade which was retreating from Mymensingh in the north to defend the capital of East Pakistan, Dacca, and its approaches. The paratroop unit was also tasked to link up with the advancing Maratha Light Infantry on the ground to advance towards the East Pakistani capital.

Operation

Para drop
A battalion of Para Commandos (India) led by Lieutenant Colonel Kulwant Singh Pannu was reinforced by an artillery battery of 17 Para Field Regiment, an engineering detachment, an ADS, a surgical team and other administrative troops from the 50th (Indep) Parachute Brigade. Tasked to cut off the retreat of the Pakistani troops from the north towards Dacca, the unit touched ground at 1630 hours and was greeted by a jubilant crowd of local people, with some even helping the troops carry their packs and ammunition. The drop was dispersed over a wide area, but the Paras regrouped quickly and commenced their attack. By 1900 hours, they had captured their main objective, cutting off the Pakistani 93 Brigade retreating from the north. Link-up with 1st battalion, The Maratha Light Infantry (1 MLI) was established after the Marathas broke through at Tangail Road and reached the bridgehead that very evening.  The Pakistanis, attempting to retake the bridge rushed the Indian positions that evening, however, were repulsed.

The Tangail Airdrop operation involved An-12, C-119s, 2 Caribous and Dakotas from 11 sqn and 48 Sqn. 49 Squadron 'the Paraspears', of the Indian Air Force was instrumental in raising and training the 'Kilo' flight of the Mukti Bahini. It was also the Paraspears who led the famed DELTA ORANGE formation of the Tangail drop which dropped troops of the 2 Para regiment which was a vital element in achieving the liberation of Bangladesh. The IAF also carried out feint drops using  dummies dropped from Caribou aircraft to hide the true location and extent of the operation.  The only hitch was a Hangup from the lead Dakota. One Paratrooper had a static line hangup, who, after carrying out emergency procedures, was dropped safely about 50 miles away.

Pakistani war crimes

Indian Army which took over the Poongli Bridge from the Pakistani Army was "shocked"  at "the sight of mutilated bodies of women, whom the Pakistani troops had killed just before fleeing from Poongli Bridge."

Aftermath
The Tangail Airdrop and the subsequent capture of the Poongli bridge gave the advancing Indian Army, assisted by Kader Bahini, the maneuverability to side-step the strongly held Tongi-Dacca Road to take the undefended Manikganj-Dacca Road right up to Mirpur Bridge at the gates of Dacca (Dhaka).

Pakistan Army's 93,000 troops unconditionally surrendered to the Indian Army and India's local ally Mukti Bahini on 16 December 1971.

Battle awards
Indian commander  Lt Col Kulwant Singh was awarded the MVC for his leadership in battle. The 2 Paras were subsequently the first Indian forces  to enter Dacca. For this and their role in Capture of the strategic bridge, the Paras received battle honour for Poongli Bridge and theatre honours for Dacca.

See also
 Timeline of the Bangladesh Liberation War
 Military plans of the Bangladesh Liberation War
 Mitro Bahini order of battle
 Pakistan Army order of battle, December 1971
 Evolution of Pakistan Eastern Command plan
 Indo-Pakistani wars and conflicts

References

Battles of Indo-Pakistani wars
Battles of the Bangladesh Liberation War
Indo-Pakistani War of 1971
1971 in India
1971 in Pakistan
1971 in Bangladesh
Aerial operations and battles involving India
December 1971 events in Asia